Mathias Abraham Torstensen (born 1890s – 9 July 1975) was a Norwegian rower who competed in the 1912 Summer Olympics.

He was a crew member of the Norwegian boat, which was eliminated in the semi-finals of the coxed fours event. Listed as bronze medalists.

References

External links
profile

1890s births
Norwegian male rowers
Olympic rowers of Norway
Rowers at the 1912 Summer Olympics

1975 deaths